Christina Onassis (11 December 1950 – 19 November 1988) was a Greek businesswoman, socialite, and heiress to the Onassis fortune. She was the only daughter of Aristotle Onassis and Athina Mary Livanos.

Early life and family
Christina Onassis, the only daughter of the Greek shipping magnate Aristotle Onassis and his first wife, Tina Onassis Niarchos, was born in New York City at the LeRoy Sanitarium. Her maternal grandfather was Stavros G. Livanos, founder of the Livanos shipping empire. Onassis had an older brother, Alexander. She and Alexander were raised and educated in France, Greece, and England. She attended the Headington School in Oxford and Queen's College, London from 1968 to 1969.

Christina's parents divorced in 1960, precipitated by her father's affair with opera singer Maria Callas. He later married former First Lady Jacqueline Kennedy, widow of US President John F. Kennedy, in 1968. Christina and Alexander reportedly distrusted Kennedy and never warmed to her. Christina's mother married Stavros Niarchos in 1971.

Within a 29-month period, Christina lost her entire immediate family. Her brother Alexander died in a plane crash in Athens in 1973 at 24, which devastated the family. Her mother died of a suspected drug overdose in 1974, leaving Christina her $77 million estate. Her father's health deteriorated after Alexander's death, and he died in March 1975. After her father's death, Christina renounced her U.S. citizenship and donated the American portion of her holdings in her father's company to the American Hospital of Paris (she held dual citizenship in Greece and Argentina throughout her life).

Career
Upon Alexander's death, Aristotle Onassis began grooming his daughter to take over the family business. She was sent to New York City to work in his office. After Aristotle's death, she inherited 55% of his fortune, then estimated to be worth $500 million. The remaining 45% funded a foundation established in Alexander's memory, the Alexander S. Onassis Foundation. After a legal settlement, Jacqueline Onassis received $26 million from the estate. Christina was the focus of her father's attention until his death; he considered her his successor and trained her in the business operations of the Onassis business empire. She carried the mantle of the Onassis shipping empire, successfully running the business after her father's death.

Christina received considerable media attention for her lavish lifestyle, spending habits, and turbulent personal life. Her frequent battles with her weight and inability to find lasting love left her unhappy, despite her wealth. She frequently went on crash diets and would lose large amounts of weight, only to gain it back when she became depressed. Diagnosed with clinical depression at the age of 30, she was prescribed barbiturates, amphetamines, and sleeping pills, to which she developed an addiction. Onassis was reportedly hospitalized for overdosing on sleeping pills in the 1970s.

Personal life

In a period of only 16 years, Onassis married four times, each ending in divorce. She wed her first husband, real estate developer Joseph Bolker, at age 20 in 1971. Bolker was a divorced father of four, 27 years her senior. Onassis's father reportedly disapproved and pressured her to divorce him. The marriage ended after nine months.

Her second husband was Greek shipping and banking heir Alexander Andreadis, whom she married shortly after her father's death in 1975. They divorced after 14 months.

Onassis's third husband was Russian shipping agent Sergei Kauzov, whom she married in 1978. They divorced the following year.

Her fourth and final marriage was to French businessman Thierry Roussel in 1984. Onassis and Roussel had a daughter, Athina (named after Onassis' mother), in 1985. They divorced after Onassis discovered that Roussel had fathered a child with his long-time mistress, Swedish model Marianne "Gaby" Landhage, during the marriage.

Death
On 19 November 1988, Christina's body was found by her maid in the bathtub of a mansion in Tortuguitas, outside of Buenos Aires, where she had been staying. An autopsy found no evidence of suicide, drug overdose or foul play, but found that Onassis had died of a heart attack caused by acute pulmonary edema. She was 37 years old. A private Greek Orthodox funeral was held for her on 20 November at a chapel on the Onassis-owned island of Skorpios, where she was buried in the Onassis family plot alongside her father and brother.

Onassis willed her fortune, worth an estimated $250 million (equivalent to $ million in ), to her only child, Athina. Raised in Switzerland by her father, Thierry Roussel, and his wife, Marianne "Gaby" Landhage, Athina gained control of half of the estate on her 18th birthday.

In popular culture
The Spanish composer Joaquín Sabina dedicated a song to Onassis called "Pobre Cristina" (Poor Christina) on his 1990 album Mentiras Piadosas., the musician Patty Griffin also dedicated the song "Christina" to Onassis.

References and sources

Sources

 

1950 births
1988 deaths
Argentine people of Greek descent
American emigrants to Argentina
Argentine women in business
Burials in Skorpios
Businesspeople from New York City
Greek businesspeople in shipping
Greek socialites
Livanos family
Onassis family
People educated at Headington School
People educated at Queen's College, London
Former United States citizens
20th-century American businesspeople
Argentine businesspeople
20th-century businesswomen
Respiratory disease deaths in Argentina
Deaths from pulmonary edema